The state highway system of the U.S. state of California is a network of highways that are owned and maintained by the California Department of Transportation (Caltrans).

Each highway is assigned a Route (officially State Highway Route) number in the Streets and Highways Code (Sections 300-635). Most of these are numbered in a statewide system, and are known as State Route X (abbreviated SR X). United States Numbered Highways are labeled US X, and Interstate Highways are Interstate X. Under the code, the state assigns a unique Route X to each highway, and does not differentiate between state, US, or Interstate highways.

The California Highway Patrol (CHP) is tasked with patrolling all state highways to enforce traffic laws.

Overview

California's highway system is governed pursuant to Division 1 of the California Streets and Highways Code, which is one of the 29 California Codes enacted by the state legislature.  Since July 1 of 1964, the majority of legislative route numbers, those defined in the Streets and Highways Code, match the sign route numbers. For example, Interstate 5 is listed as "Route 5" in the code.

On the other hand, some short routes are instead signed as parts of other routes — for instance, Route 112 and Route 260 are signed as part of the longer State Route 61, and Route 51 is part of Interstate 80 Business.

Concurrences are not explicitly codified in the Streets and Highways Code; such highway segments are listed on only one of the corresponding legislative route numbers — for example, the I-80/I-580 concurrency, known as the Eastshore Freeway, only falls under the Route 80 description in the highway code while the definition of Route 580 is broken into non-contiguous segments.

The state may relinquish segments of highways and turn them over to local control. If the relinquished segment is in the middle of the highway's route, the local jurisdiction is usually required to install and maintain signs directing drivers to the continuation of that highway; they are not generally required to do so if the relinquishment effectively truncates the highway at one end, or is done as part of the process to re-route a highway. The state may also delete a highway completely and turn over an entire state route to local control.

Business routes are not maintained by the state unless they are also assigned legislative route numbers. A route or sections of a route may also be considered unrelinquished - a new alignment has been built, or the legislative definition has changed to omit the section, but the state still owns the roadway — and are officially Route XU. For example, State Route 14U is an old alignment of State Route 14 whose control has not yet been transferred to the City of Santa Clarita.

Some new alignments are considered supplemental and have a suffix of S. For example, an expressway replacement for State Route 86 between approximately three miles north of the Imperial/Riverside County line and Interstate 10 east of Indio was initially signed as State Route 86S until it was eventually transferred to SR 86. Likewise, the freeway replacement for State Route 180 in Fresno was initially referred to as State Route 180S.

History

The first legislative routes were defined by the State Highway Bond Act in 1909, passed by the California State Legislature and signed by Governor James Gillett. These, and later extensions to the system, were numbered sequentially. No signs were erected for these routes.

The United States Numbered Highways were assigned by the American Association of State Highway Officials (AASHO) in November 1926, but posting did not begin in California until January 1928. These were assigned to some of the main legislative routes in California. Initially, signs were posted by the Automobile Club of Southern California (ACSC) and California State Automobile Association (CSAA), which had been active in signing national auto trails and local roads since the mid-1900s.

In 1934, after the major expansion of the state highway system in 1933 by the California Legislature, California sign route numbers were assigned by the California Division of Highways (predecessor to Caltrans).  The California sign route numbers were assigned in a geographical system, completely independent of the legislative routes. Odd-numbered routes ran north–south and even-numbered routes ran east–west. The routes were split among southern California (ACSC) and central and northern California (CSAA) as follows:
0 or 1 modulo 4: central and northern California
2 or 3 modulo 4: southern California
For instance, State Route 1 and State Route 4 were in central and northern California, and State Route 2 and State Route 3 (since moved) were in southern California. A rough grid was used inside the two regions, with the largest numbers — all less than 200 (except for State Route 740, which was related to State Route 74) - in eastern California (north–south) and near the border between the two regions (east–west).

The Interstate Highway System numbers were assigned by AASHO in late 1959. In 1963 and 1964, a total renumbering of the legislative routes was made, aligning them with the sign routes. Some changes were also made to the sign routes, mostly related to decommissionings of U.S. Routes in favor of Interstates.

Since the 1990s, many non-freeway routes, especially in urban areas, have been deleted and turned over to local control. This transfers the cost of maintaining them from state to local budgets, but also gives local governments direct control over urban arterial roads that carry primarily local traffic.  Once transferred, if a local government wants to add landscaping in the center median or install additional traffic lights or other traffic control devices, it can immediately do so itself rather than having to negotiate with Caltrans.  Not all cities have been prepared to accept such routes from Caltrans simultaneously, so many have been decommissioned from the state system one fragment at a time.  In the case of the San Francisco Bay Area, the Caltrans district responsible for that region is granted permission to retain in the State highway system routes that run on conventional (non freeway or expressway) roadways unless a freeway is built to bypass the surface street route.

Nomenclature in California English

One cultural difference between Northern and Southern Californians is that the latter tend to put the definite article "the" before highway numbers (e.g. "taking the 5 to L.A."), while the former use the number alone (e.g. "taking 80 to San Francisco") or less frequently, with "I-" in the case of interstate freeways. The Southern California usage of the definite article  is seen as stereotypical of Southern California "surfer" culture, and has been parodied in the recurring Saturday Night Live sketch "The Californians". When the Southern California freeway system was built in the 1940s and early 1950s, local common usage was primarily the freeway name preceded by the definite article, such as "the Hollywood Freeway". It took several decades for Southern California locals to start to commonly refer to the freeways with the numerical designations, but usage of the definite article persisted. For example, it evolved to "the 605 Freeway" and then shortened to "the 605". This did not occur in Northern California, where usage of the route numbers was more common.

List of routes
The list of routes, as defined in the California Streets and Highways code, is split into the following pages:
 List of Interstate Highways in California
 List of U.S. Routes in California
 List of state highways in California

Former U.S. Routes In California

U.S. Route 40
U.S. Route 40 Alternate
U.S. Route 48
U.S. Route 60
U.S. Route 66
U.S. Route 70
U.S. Route 80
U.S. Route 91
U.S. Route 99
U.S. Route 99E (central California)
U.S. Route 99E (northern California)
U.S. Route 99W (central California)
U.S. Route 99W (northern California)
U.S. Route 101A
U.S. Route 101 Bypass (San Francisco Bay area)
U.S. Route 101 Bypass (Los Angeles & Orange counties)
U.S. Route 101E
U.S. Route 101W
U.S. Route 299
U.S. Route 399
U.S. Route 466

See also

Deleted California State Highways
Unconstructed California State Highways
Scenic California State Highways
List of county routes in California

References

External links
California Highways - Provides a complete history of California State Routes and every state route.
Road Signs of California
AARoads California Highways Page
1964 Highway Renumbering
Historic California U.S. Routes
California by RV - Provides complete maps of California Main State Routes.

 
High